is a short novel by Mieko Kawakami, published by Bungeishunjū in February 2008. It was awarded the 138th Akutagawa Prize. The original work has not been translated into English.

In 2019, Kawakami published the novel . It features a completely rewritten version of the original 2008 novella, but uses the same characters and settings. An English translation of Natsu Monogatari was published in 2020, under the original title of Breasts and Eggs. It is a completely different work from the original 2008 novella. The novella is part of a "loosely connected trilogy," including Heaven and All the Lovers in the Night.

Background and publication
 is Kawakami's second novel. Her debut novel, was published in 2007 and was a candidate for the Akutagawa Prize. Kawakami first found literary success as a blogger, with her blog later reaching 200,000 hits per day.  was first written in blog form in the mid-2000s. It was first published in the December 2007 issue of Bungakukai. It won the 138th Akutagawa Prize for the second half of 2007, which was announced on 16 January 2008. It was published as a hardcover book on 25 February 2008 by Bungeishunjū. It is characterized by a writing style that is separated by commas and continues endlessly without line breaks. It is written in the Kansai dialect of western Japan. Specifically, it is typified by Kawakami's use of the regional dialect Osaka-ben. It was reprinted in the March 2008 special issue of the Bungeishunjū magazine. A paperback edition was published by Bungei Bunko on 10 September 2010. The original 2008 novel has not been translated into English.

Natsu Monogatari
In 2019, Kawakami published the two-part novel . The first half of Natsu Monogatari is a completely rewritten version of the original 2008 novella. The second half is a continuation of the narrative. It is considered a sequel to the original novella, using the same characters and settings.

English translation
The sequel novel was translated into English by Sam Bett and David Boyd, but kept the original title of Breasts and Eggs. The translation was published in the United States by Europa Editions on 7 April 2020. It was published in the United Kingdom by Picador on 20 August 2020.

The English translation is divided in two parts and is narrated by Natsuko Natsume (夏子 Natsuko), an aspiring writer in Tokyo. In the first part, Natsuko's sister, Makiko (巻子), and her 12-year-old daughter, Midoriko (緑子), arrive in Tokyo from Osaka. Makiko has come to Tokyo seeking a clinic for breast augmentation. Midoriko has not spoken to her mother in six months. Midoriko's journal entries are interspersed and contain her thoughts about becoming a woman and recognizing the changes in her body. In the second part, set years later, Natsuko contemplates becoming a mother and the options open to her as an older single woman in Japan.

Reception
Writer and then-governor of Tokyo, Shintaro Ishihara, who himself won the Akutagawa Prize in 1955 and was a sitting member of its selection committee, criticized the selection of Kawakami's novel for the prize. In Bungeishunjū he wrote, "The egocentric, self-absorbed rambling of the work is unpleasant and intolerable."

English translation
Kirkus Reviews criticized the "flat" English translation, writing that Kawakami's writing style is "lost on Anglophone readers, and her frank talk about class and sexism and reproductive choice is noteworthy primarily within the context of Japanese literary culture."

Publishers Weekly praised the "bracing and evocative" narrative of the novel's first part, but felt the second part faltered into an "overlong and chatty" narrative.

References

External links 
 Breasts and Eggs - Europa Editions

2008 Japanese novels
Bungeishunjū books
First-person narrative novels
Japanese novellas
Novels about families
Novels about siblings
Novels set in Tokyo
Works originally published in Bungakukai
Akutagawa Prize-winning works